George Aryee is a Ghanaian public servant. He served as the Director General of the Ghana Broadcasting Corporation from 1991 to 1992.

Early life and education 
Aryee had his secondary education at Adisadel College, Cape Coast, and later continued at Wesley College, Kumasi to train as a teacher in 1959. After his teacher training, he enrolled at the University of Cape Coast where he graduated with a bachelor's degree in 1969. A year later he obtained a Canadian International Development Agency (CIDA) sponsored scholarship to study at the University of Ottawa, Canada, where he obtained his Master's degree in Administration.

Career 
Following his studies abroad, Aryee joined the Advanced Teacher Training College, Winneba (one of the colleges that were merged to create the University of Education, Winneba) as a lecturer. He later worked at Central Regional Development Corporation as its Managing Director, and the African Timber and Plywood company as a Training and Development Manager and later its Public Relations Manager. Prior to his appointment as Director General of Ghana Broadcasting Corporation, he was the managing director of a food processing company called Tema Food Complex. Aryee served as the Director General of the Ghana Broadcasting Corporation from 1991 to 1992.

See also 

 Ghana Broadcasting Corporation

References 

Ghanaian educators
Broadcasting in Ghana
Alumni of Adisadel College
University of Cape Coast alumni
University of Ottawa alumni